Richard Nii Armah Quaye is a Ghanaian entrepreneur, founder, chief executive officer and board chairman of Quick Angels Limited and also Quick Credit and Investment Micro-credit Limited. He is claimed to be the first angel investor in Ghana.

Early life and education 
Quaye was born on 21 March 1984 and hails from Jamestown in the Greater Accra Region of Ghana.

Career 
Quaye began his career as a businessman and on 8 May 2019, he established the Quick Angels Limited that focuses on promoting start-ups and businesses in Ghana. The company has funded businesses such as Ridge Medical Centre, Doughman foods, Colin network, Sankofa natural spices, Benjie, Duke rice, Zaconut, and Burger King, among others.

In August 2019, he made a speech at the 3rd edition of the Entrepreneurs Forum by the Ghana Investment Promotion Council.

In December 2019, the Entrepreneurship Through Acquisition, a business club at the Harvard Business School invited him to speak at their 5th annual conference.

Awards and recognition 
In October 2019, Quaye won the Investment Award category.

In September 2020, Quaye emerged as the overall winner in the 2020 40 under 40 awards at Kempinski Hotel in Accra. He again claimed the Investment Award category. He also won the European CEO Entrepreneur of the year 2020 award.

In May 2021, he also received the Outstanding financial service entrepreneur and the outstanding CEO in the 2021 11th Ghana Entrepreneur and Corporate Executive Awards. In July and August 2021, he received the Outstanding Business Investor Awards and the Outstanding Business Leader in the 2021 Ghana Business Standards Awards.

References 

Living people
Ghanaian business executives
Ghanaian businesspeople
Ghanaian chief executives
People from Accra
Year of birth missing (living people)
1984 births
21st-century Ghanaian businesspeople